Epsom is an unincorporated community in Bogard Township, Daviess County, in the U.S. state of Indiana.

History
The first settlement at Epsom was made about 1815. The community took its name from a nearby well containing water which tasted of epsom salts.

A post office was established at Epsom in 1856, and remained in operation until it was discontinued in 1905.

Geography

References

External links

Unincorporated communities in Daviess County, Indiana
Unincorporated communities in Indiana
1810s establishments in Indiana
Populated places established in the 1810s